Qeshlaq Amir Khanlu-ye Pol-e Rahman (also Romanized as Qeshlāq Amīr Khānlū-ye Pol-e Raḩmān) is a village in Mahmudabad Rural District, Tazeh Kand District, Parsabad County, Ardabil Province, Iran. At the 2006 census, its population was 123, in 31 families.

References 

Towns and villages in Parsabad County